United Nations Security Council Resolution 453, adopted unanimously on 12 September 1979, after examining the application of Saint Lucia for membership in the United Nations, the Council recommended to the General Assembly that Saint Lucia be admitted.

See also
 Member states of the United Nations
 List of United Nations Security Council Resolutions 401 to 500 (1976–1982)

References
Text of the Resolution at undocs.org

External links
 

 0453
 0453
 0453
1979 in Saint Lucia
September 1979 events